is a Japanese manga series written and illustrated by Yana Toboso. It has been serialized in Square Enix's shōnen manga magazine Monthly GFantasy since September 2006. The series follows Ciel Phantomhive, the twelve-year-old Earl of Phantomhive serving as the Queen's Watchdog. He is tasked with solving crimes in the underworld of Victorian-era London. Ciel has formed a contract with demon Sebastian Michaelis, who disguises himself as his butler, to seek revenge on those who tortured him and murdered his parents. In exchange for his services, Sebastian will be allowed to consume Ciel's soul.

A twenty-four episode anime television series adaption, produced by A-1 Pictures, aired from October 2008 to March 2009. A second twelve episode season aired from July to September 2010; this season features two new main characters and has an anime-original storyline which does not feature manga content. A third season, titled Black Butler: Book of Circus, was broadcast between July and September 2014. A two-part theatrical original video animation (OVA), titled Black Butler: Book of Murder, screened in Japanese theaters in October and November 2014. A live-action film adaptation was released in Japan in January 2014. An animated film, titled Black Butler: Book of the Atlantic, premiered in Japan in January 2017.

In North America, the series has been licensed by Yen Press. It was published in Yen Plus from August 2009 to July 2010. The anime series was licensed by Funimation. Funimation lost the rights to the first two seasons, and they were later acquired by Aniplex of America.

By July 2022, the Black Butler manga had over 32 million copies in circulation.

Plot

In Victorian-era London lives a twelve-year-old earl named Ciel Phantomhive, who has acquired this position after the events of his tenth birthday on December 14, 1885, when the Phantomhive manor was attacked by unidentified perpetrators and set ablaze. Ciel, amidst the chaos, discovers his parents, Vincent and Rachel Phantomhive, to be dead along with the family dog, Sebastian. The same night, he is kidnapped by the attackers and then sold into slavery, where he ends up in the hands of a sadistic, demon-worshipping cult. Ciel then endures endless physical, mental and sexual abuse at the hands of his captors. Ciel was also heat-branded with a mark referred to as the "mark of the beast".

One night, during a sacrificial ceremony to summon a demon, instead of forming a contract with the cult members, the demon states that he was summoned by Ciel, therefore, he only agrees to form a contract with him, killing all the cultist members in the process. To show a contract was formed, the demon places a contract symbol referred to as the Faustian contract symbol on Ciel's right eye, giving it a purple hue, and his iris and pupil now showcase the symbol of the covenant. After the formation of the contract, the demon reveals that he will consume Ciel's soul as payment for helping him achieve his goal; revenge on those who brought down the House of Phantomhive.

Afterwards, Ciel names the demon Sebastian Michaelis, after his deceased pet dog. The duo then return to society as Ciel takes over his now late father's previous position as the queen's watchdog, a very high-profile individual who is tasked with investigating cases that Queen Victoria herself deems especially important or threatening to England and the crown.

Media

Manga

Written and illustrated by Yana Toboso, Black Butler has been serialized in Square Enix's shōnen manga magazine Monthly GFantasy since September 16, 2006. Square Enix has collected its chapters into individual tankōbon volumes. The first volume was released on February 27, 2007. As of July 27, 2022, thirty-two volumes have been released.

Yen Press licensed the series for an English language release and serialized the manga in Yen Plus August 2009 issue for the magazine's first anniversary. The publisher released the first volume on January 26, 2010. As of August 24, 2021, thirty volumes have been released.

The series has been licensed in France by Kana; in Germany by Carlsen Comics; in Italy by Panini Comics; in Poland by Waneko; in Finland by Punainen jättiläinen; and in Spain by Norma Editorial.

Drama CD
On August 10, 2007, a drama CD was released by Frontier Works. It featured many of the characters appearing in volumes one and two. A second drama CD was released on November 26, 2008, under the Aniplex label.

Anime

In July 2008, it was announced that an anime adaption of Black Butler, directed by Toshiya Shinohara and produced by A-1 Pictures. It premiered in October 2008 and broadcast on MBS as well as the TBS. On January 1, 2009, a limited edition DVD containing the first episode was released by Aniplex. The next three episodes were released on another DVD on February 25, 2009. On an event on June 14, 2009, it was announced that the anime would be returning for a second series. Japanese voice actor Junichi Suwabe confirmed this news on his official blog later that day. The second series, Black Butler II, premiered in July and follows a butler, Claude Faustus, and his master, Alois Trancy, as well as Sebastian and Ciel. Both new characters were designed by Toboso. Aniplex later released the complete Blu-ray and DVD on May 7, 2014.

On March 29, 2010, North American anime distributor Funimation announced on their online FuniCon 3.0 panel that they had licensed Black Butler. At Anime Expo 2010, Funimation also announced that they would stream the simulcast series, Black Butler II. Funimation announced on their Facebook page that they had fully licensed the second season. Funimation released Black Butler Combo Pack Blu-ray/DVD first and second season on April 3, 2012. The series made its North American television debut on February 8, 2011, on the Funimation Channel. Funimation lost the rights to the series' first season in 2017, and the rights to the second season in 2018. The first season is currently licensed by Aniplex of America and it was released on a Blu-ray Disc box set on January 29, 2019. In November 2019, Funimation re-licensed the first two seasons for its streaming service.

On January 16, 2014, it was announced that a third Black Butler anime series had been green-lit. Titled Black Butler: Book of Circus, the series was a close adaptation of the manga, unlike the previous seasons, adapting the "Noah's Ark Circus" arc.  The series was directed by Noriyuki Abe at A-1 Pictures, with Hiroyuki Yoshino in charge of scripts, along with Ichiro Okuchi and Yuka Miyata as scriptwriters. The main cast from the previous anime series returned, along with new cast members, and the series aired from July 10, 2014, to September 12, 2014.  In addition, a two-part original video animation (OVA) titled the Book of Murder, an adaptation of the "Phantomhive Manor Murders" arc, was screened in Japanese theatres on October 25, and November 15, 2014. The OVAs featured returning staff from the previous season.

On August 7, 2014, Funimation announced that they have licensed Black Butler: Book of Circus, and have streamed it on their simulcast. Funimation released the series on Blu-ray and DVD on April 19, 2016. Additionally, Funimation has licensed the two-part OVA Black Butler: Book of Murder and released it on May 17, 2016.

Musical
, a musical adaptation of the manga, had run at the Sunshine Theater in Ikebukuro between May 28, 2009, and June 7, 2009. Yuya Matsushita portrayed Sebastian Michaelis, Shougo Sakamoto played Ciel Phantomhive and Uehara Takuya as Grell Sutcliff.

, the second musical adaptation of the manga, ran at Akasaka Act Theater (1300 seats) in Akasaka, Tokyo, Nagoya, and Osaka, between May 3 and May 23, 2010. Yuya Matsushita reprised his role as Sebastian Michaelis, Yukito Nishii played Ciel Phantomhive, and Uehara Takuya reprised his role as Grell Sutcliff. The other two main characters, Eric Slingby and Alan Humphries, were portrayed by Taisuke Saeki and Shinya Matsumoto, respectively. The musical was written by Mari Okada, directed by Sakurako Fukuyama, with music composed by Taku Iwasaki, and lyrics by Yukinojo Mori. A second run of The Most Beautiful Death in the World was announced in December 2012. It ran between May 17 and June 9, 2013, in the Akasaka ACT Theater (Akasaka, Tokyo) again, and the Umeda Arts Theater in Osaka. It was announced in February 2013 that Yuya Matsushita, Uehara Takuya, and Shuhei Izumi would reprise their roles as Sebastian Michaelis, Grell Sutcliff, and the Undertaker, respectively. The rest of the roles were re-cast, with Taketo Tanaka replacing Yukito Nishii as Ciel Phantomhive, and Shinji Rachi and Masataka Nakagauchi replacing Taisuke Saeki and Matsumoto Shinya in the roles of Eric Slingby and Alan Humphries.

A third musical  was performed in September 2014. Most of the cast reprised their roles from the re-run of The Most Beautiful Death in the World although Fukuzaki Nayuta replaced Taketo Tanaka as Ciel Phantomhive and Yuka Terasaki replaced Saki Matsuda as Mey-Rin. Akane Liv was introduced as Madam Red, Yuusuke Hirose as Charles Phipps, Oota Motohiro as Charles Grey and Araki Hirofumi as Lau. A re-run of the third Black Butler musical "Lycoris that Blazes the Earth" was scheduled to perform in November–December 2015. It started in Osaka on November 7 then travel to Miyagi, Tokyo and Fukuoka. The new run of the third musical was the first oversea tour in China (Shanghai, Beijing, Shenzhen) in December 2015. Yuta Furukawa replaced Matsushita as Sebastian Michaelis. Meanwhile, most of the cast from the third musical reprised their roles.

A fourth Black Butler musical, based on the Noah's Ark Circus arc of the manga, ran between November–December 2016. Yuta Furukawa reprised his role as Sebastian Michaelis, with Reo Uchikawa replacing Nayuta Fukuzaki as Ciel. Miura Ryosuke was introduced as Joker, Tano Asami as Beast and Tamaki Yuki as Snake, among others. Notably, Izumi Shuuhei reprised his role as the Undertaker again, making him the only original cast member still performing.

A fifth Black Butler musical, Tango on the Campania, which was based on the Luxury Liner arc in the manga, ran between December 2017 to February 2018. Yuta Furukawa reprised his role as Sebastian Michaelis, with Reo Uchikawa also reprising his role as Ciel Phantomhive. Mikata Ryosuke was introduced as Ronald Knox, Okazaki Momoko as Elizabeth Midford, and others. Other actors from previous performers also reprised their roles, such as Uehara Takuya as Grell Sutcliff, Izumi Shuuhei as the Undertaker, and Sasaki Yoshihide as Viscount Druitt.

Video game
A video game for Nintendo DS, called Kuroshitsuji Phantom & Ghost was developed by Square Enix and was released on March 19, 2009. The game is sold in two versions, a limited first-press edition with a higher price and numerous extra goods, and a regular edition.

Print
The book  was released on March 27, 2009. An official comics anthology  was also released on that date.

Films

It was announced on January 18, 2013, that the manga would be made into a live-action film starring Ayame Goriki as Genpou Shiori, Hiro Mizushima as Sebastian Michaelis. Filming began in April 2013 and the film was released on January 18, 2014.

On October 10, 2015, it was announced an animated film for the series has been green-lit, and the original anime cast returned to reprise their roles. On February 17, 2016, the film Black Butler: Book of the Atlantic, was confirmed to be an animated adaptation of the  arc from the original manga. It was released in Japan on January 21, 2017. On April 1, 2017, Funimation announced that they have licensed the animated film and would screen it in a limited theatrical release in North America later in the year. Black Butler: Book of the Atlantic, premiered in Japan on January 21, 2017, and in North America on the selected dates of June 12 and 14, 2017.

Reception
By January 2021, the Black Butler manga had over 30 million copies in circulation worldwide. By July 2022, the manga had over 32 million copies in circulation. Individual volumes have appeared in Oricon's weekly chart of best-selling manga, taking several high spots. In addition to the volumes, the comics anthology Rainbow Butler ranked seventeenth during the week of March 31 to April 6 2009, selling 41,083 copies after ranking thirty-third the previous week. The fourth and fifth volumes ranked thirty-third and thirty-ninth of the top-selling manga in Japan during 2008, selling 529,210 copies and 468,550 copies respectively. The sixth volume ranked thirteenth of the top-selling manga in Japan during the first half of 2009, selling 619,501 copies. The series itself was ranked tenth of the top-selling manga series in Japan during 2009, selling a total of 1,603,197 estimated copies.

The Japanese music distributor Recochoku has created an annual survey of which anime characters that people would like to marry. Sebastian Michaelis ranked ninth in the category "The Character I Want to Be My Groom".

See also
 List of Gangan Comics manga franchises

References

External links

  at Square Enix 
  
  
  on Funimation
 Black Butler on Netflix
 
 

2006 manga
2008 Japanese television series debuts
2008 anime television series debuts
2009 Japanese television series endings
2010 Japanese television series debuts
2010 Japanese television series endings
2010 anime television series debuts
A-1 Pictures
Anime series
Animeism
Aniplex
Black Butler
Comics set in London
Cultural depictions of Queen Victoria
Dark comedy anime and manga
Dark fantasy anime and manga
Demons in anime and manga
Fiction set in 1889
Funimation
Gangan Comics manga
Historical fantasy anime and manga 
Manga adapted into films
Musicals based on anime and manga
Nintendo DS games
Anime and manga about revenge
Shinigami in anime and manga
Shōnen manga
Square Enix franchises
Supernatural anime and manga
Television shows written by Mari Okada
United Kingdom in fiction
Works based on the Faust legend
Yen Press titles